Masiphumelele High School is a publicly owned secondary school (grades 8–12) in Masiphumelele in the Western Cape region of South Africa. As of 2005 it had some 942 students. The school has piped indoor water.

In February 2006 students of the school were involved in violent protests, which resulted injuries to two teachers and damage to three police vehicles.

References 
 Western Cape Education Department profile

Schools in Cape Town